Jieshi is a town in  32,300 under the administration of Wendeng District, eastern Shandong province, People's Republic of China. It also borders Huancui District to the north and Yantai City's Muping District to the west. The town oversees 65 administrative villages and 88 natural villages.

Jieshi sits in a basin surrounded on four sides by low-lying mountains, among them the Kunyu Mountains, the primary peak of which is Mount Taibo.

References

Township-level divisions of Shandong